Niveditha Arjun  is an Indian actress, producer and dancer. After making her acting debut with M. S. Rajashekar's Kannada Movie Ratha Sapthami (1986) under the stagename of Asha Rani, she opted against an acting career and continued pursuing her passion as a dancer and also worked as a producer with Sree Raam Films International. The daughter of actor Rajesh, Niveditha is married to actor Arjun Sarja and is the mother of actress Aishwarya Arjun.

Personal life
Niveditha is the daughter of Kannada film actor, Rajesh. Niveditha married actor Arjun Sarja and the pair have two daughters, Aishwarya and Anjana. Aishwarya has worked as an actress in Tamil and Kannada films, while Anjana Arjun works as a fashion designer in New York.

Career
Niveditha entered the Kannada film industry with the stage name of Asha Rani, and first appeared in Ratha Sapthami (1986). Directed by M. S. Rajashekar, she featured alongside Shiva Rajkumar, and the film went on to perform well commercially. Soon after her marriage to Arjun Sarja, Niveditha chose to quit her work as an actress and shifted to Chennai to raise a family. In recent years, she has worked with Arjun's home production studio Sree Raam Films International, and has been credited as a producer.

Away from her work in films, Niveditha has often also performed on stage as a classical dancer.

Filmography
Actress

Producer

See also

List of Indian actresses

References

External links

Actresses in Kannada cinema
Actresses from Karnataka
Living people
Indian female classical dancers
Performers of Indian classical dance
Bharatanatyam exponents
Year of birth missing (living people)
Dancers from Karnataka
20th-century Indian actresses
Indian film actresses
Tamil film producers
Women artists from Karnataka
20th-century Indian women artists